Barbara Bergin is an Irish actress, writer and director. She is the creator of The Darkest Hour, a darkly comic satire podcast about disappointment.

Among her acting credits are comedy sketch show Stew, Fair City, The Snapper, The Van and Intermission. Theatre credits include Cell by Paula Meehan, for which she won an Irish Times Irish Theatre Award and the Corn Exchange's adaptation of Dubliners by James Joyce.

Her writing credits include The Clinic and the IFTA award-winning Love Is the Drug. She directed On the Couch, a six-part comedy drama she created and wrote with Gary Cooke.

References

External links

Barbara Bergin at Playography Ireland
 Darkest Hour podcast

Irish stage actresses
Irish film actresses
Irish television actresses
Living people
Year of birth missing (living people)
Irish women screenwriters